Bressingham Steam & Gardens is a steam museum and gardens located at Bressingham (adjacent to a garden centre), west of Diss in Norfolk, England. The site has several narrow gauge rail lines and a number of types of steam engines and vehicles in its collection and is also the home of a Dad's Army exhibition.

The gardens

The gardens were established by Alan Bloom MBE at Bressingham Hall. He was a plant expert of international renown, particularly in the field of hardy perennials. He laid out the Dell Garden at Bressingham, with its well-known island beds. His son, Adrian Bloom, laid out five additional gardens for year-round interest, starting with Foggy Bottom in 1963. He is still largely in charge of the Bressingham Gardens, which are not part of the charity but are privately owned by the Bloom family business. The Dell Garden is curated by Alan Bloom's son-in-law, Jaime Blake.

Much of the site is given over to commercial horticulture. The nurseries are not open to the public, but there is a garden centre on the site, which is independent from the Steam Museum and the Bloom Nurseries and Gardens. Bressingham Steam Museum is an independent charitable trust. Alan Bloom had wanted to create his own trust in 1967, to ensure that the collection would not be dispersed to pay for death duties, but the laws of the time made this difficult and after five years of negotiation, the museum was close to being handed over to the Transport Trust. However, the legislation governing private museums was relaxed just before the proposed handover in 1971. Consequently, Bloom was able to create his own trust and thus retain control of it, because the collection was of historical and educational importance.

The Gallopers 

The three-abreast Gallopers, purchased by Alan Bloom in 1967, are the centrepiece of the site. They were built by Frederick Savage in Kings Lynn in 1897 and were owned and operated by the Thurston family of Norfolk until 1934. The Gallopers later operated at Whitley Bay and later in Scotland before finding a home at Bressingham. They are currently powered by electricity, but were previously steam-powered. The engine used, "Victoria", was originally built by Tidmans of Norwich. The organ – a Bruder-built, 48 keyless Chiappa – which was built from two organs in 1954, accompanies the Gallopers.

The narrow gauge lines
There are three railway lines which take visitors around the gardens:

The Garden Railway
This  gauge miniature railway runs through the Dell Garden, giving passengers clear views of the beds. The journey begins in a terminus station within the museum grounds before heading into the Dell Garden. At the far end of the garden, the train is turned in a balloon loop, before returning to the station. A turntable is located at the end of the platform road to facilitate the turning of the locomotive with minimal movements required. The points located at the balloon loop and the entrance to the platform road are spring operated so there is no requirement for a signalman. The coloured light aspect signal protecting the platform is interlocked with the lie of the points being set for the platform road and the turntable also being set to the platform road. The railway's passenger trains are operated by steam locomotive Alan Bloom, which was constructed along with the railway in 1995. The design of Alan Bloom was inspired by the design of Large Quarry Hunslet George Sholto, which operates on Bressingham's Fen Railway.

The Fen Railway

The Fen Railway (formerly the Nursery Railway)n is a  narrow gauge railway. It was the second railway to be completed at Bressingham, first opening in 1966. It also runs through meadows and passes the now-defunct plant nurseries. The Railway was extended twice following initial completion to become the length it is today.

Locomotives:

The Waveney Valley Railway 

 gauge miniature railway. It crosses the  Fen Railway and also runs parallel to the  line for a time.

Locomotives:

During 2013, a circular track of dual  gauge and  gauge was under construction.
Once completed, there will be a total of seven different gauges at Bressingham.

Standard gauge steam locomotives

 NSB NSB Class 21c  No. 377 King Haakon VII. Built in 1919. Last overhauled in 2006. Stored awaiting overhaul.
 LB&SCR A1 Class  No. 662 Martello. Built in 1875. Operational, boiler ticket expires in 2026. Painted in SR Lined Green.
 GER Class T26  No. 490. Built in 1894. On static display, on loan from the National Railway Museum.
 LT&SR 79 Class  No. 80 Thundersley. Built in 1909. On static display, on loan from the National Railway Museum.
 GER Class S56  No. 87. Built in 1904. On static display, on loan from the National Railway Museum.
 LSWR B4 class  No 102 Granville. Built in 1893. On static display.
 Beckton Gas Works  No. 25. Built in 1896. On static display.
 Baddesley Colliery Beyer-Garratt  No. 6841 William Francis. Built in 1937. On static display. This is the last surviving standard gauge Garratt in Britain.
 DB/NSR Class 52  No. 5865 Peer Gynt. Built in 1944. Found in a caved-in tunnel and restored, now on static display.
 Andrew Barclay  No. 1472 Bluebottle. Built in 1916. Stored out of use.
 Robert Stephenson & Hawthorns  No. 7070 Millfield. Built in 1942. Stored out of use.

Broad gauge steam locomotives
 VR Class Tk3  No. 1144. Plinthed.

Steam vehicles
A variety of steam vehicles are in the collection.

Steam Engines Portable and others 
 Burrell No. 2363 of 1901 Portable. Operational.
 Youngs Portable of 1910. Manufactured locally in Diss. On display.  
 Tidman Centre Engine (fairground) No. 1891 Victoria. Usually resides in the centre section of Gallopers. Withdrawn 2015 pending replacement of Boiler Barrel - Expected to re-enter service late 2019 
 Merryweather Fire Engine no. 3702.
 Merryweather Fire Pump of 1914.

Steam Rollers
Burrell No. 3962 Boxer of 1923 reg no. PW 1714. On display.
Burrell No. 3993 Buster of 1924 reg no. CF 5646. Operational.
Robey (company) 4 ton Tandem Steam Roller No. 42520 Barkis built in 1925 reg No. FE 7632. On display.

Steam Tractors / Traction
Garrett 5 ton Steam Tractor No. 34641 Bunty, built in 1924 reg no. CF 5913. Operational.
Burrell Traction engine No. 3112 Bertha of 1909 reg no. CF 3440. On display.
Foster Traction engine No. 2821 Beryl of 1903 reg. no. BE 7448. On display.
Fowler Traction engine No. 6188 Beulah of 1890 reg no. MA 8528. On display.

Gallery

Dad's Army Collection
The museum is the home of the national Dad's Army collection of vintage vehicles. These are located on a reconstruction of the High Street in the fictional Walmington-on-Sea beside the butcher's shop of Lance-Corporal Jones, Private Frazer's undertaker's shop and Captain Mainwaring's bank office.

The vehicles include Jones' van and the dust cart from the 1971 film, Mainwaring's Austin 8 staff car used in the episode The Making of Private Pike, the vintage fire engine used in Brain Versus Brawn and the steamroller 'Boxer' and traction engine 'Bertha' which appeared in other episodes.

See also
 Index of steam energy articles

References

External links

Official website
The Bressingham Gardens website

Heritage railways in Norfolk
Miniature railways in the United Kingdom
Railway museums in England
Museums in Norfolk
Steam museums in England
Gardens in Norfolk
15 in gauge railways in England
2 ft gauge railways in England
10¼ in gauge railways in England